Fairfax Bridge may refer to:

 Fairfax Bridge (Missouri River) in Kansas and Missouri (demolished)
 Fairfax Bridge (Washington) over the Carbon River